The Upshaws is an American sitcom created by Regina Y. Hicks and Wanda Sykes. The series stars Sykes, Mike Epps, Kim Fields, Page Kennedy, Diamond Lyons, Khali Spraggins, Jermelle Simon, Gabrielle Dennis, and Journey Christine. The series premiered on Netflix on May 12, 2021. In June 2021, the series was renewed for a second season, with the first part being released on June 29, 2022. The second part of the second season premiered on February 16, 2023. In October 2022, the series was renewed for a third season.

Cast and characters

Main 
Mike Epps as Bernard "Bennie" Upshaw Sr., patriarch of the Upshaw family, Regina's high-school sweetheart and eventual husband. He is the owner of Bennie's Garage. 
Kim Fields as Regina Upshaw (née Turner), the matriarch of the Upshaw family; Bennie Sr's wife and mother to Bernard Jr., Aaliyah, and Maya.
Wanda Sykes as Lucretia Turner, Regina's older sister who has an antagonistic relationship with Bennie
Diamond Lyons as Kelvin Upshaw, Bennie and Tasha's son who is the same age as Aaliyah, who calls Kelvin her "Ghetto Twin". He was conceived when Bennie thought he and Regina were on a break.
Khali Spraggins as Aaliyah Upshaw, Bennie and Regina's eldest daughter
Page Kennedy as Duck, an old friend of Bennie's who also works at his garage. He is recently out of prison and has become a Born-Again Christian. 
Jermelle Simon as Bernard Upshaw Jr., Bennie and Regina's eldest child and only son together. He has a strained relationship with his father, who wasn't there for him until he was 16.
Gabrielle Dennis as Tasha Lewis, Kelvin's mother
Journey Christine as Maya Upshaw, Bennie and Regina's youngest child

Recurring 
Mike Estime as Tony, Bennie's friend and employee
Dayna Dooley as Sheila, Regina's boss at the hospital
Daria Johns as Savannah, Aaliyah's best friend
Jessica Morris as Amy, Regina's friend
Dewayne Perkins as Hector, Bernard Jr.'s boyfriend
Leonard Earl Howze as Davis, another of Bennie's friends

Episodes

Series overview

Season 1 (2021)

Season 2 (2022—23)

Production

Development
On August 20, 2019, Netflix gave production a series order. The Upshaws is created by Regina Y. Hicks and Wanda Sykes who are expected to executive produce alongside Mike Epps, Niles Kirchner, and Page Hurwitz. Push It Productions is the production company involved with producing the series. The series was released on May 12, 2021. On June 24, 2021, Netflix renewed the series for a 16-episode second season which is expected to be split into two parts. The first part of the second season was released on June 29, 2022. The second part of second season premiered on February 16, 2023. On October 26, 2022, Netflix renewed the series for a third season.

The series is set in Indianapolis, but it is shot in the Old Warner Brothers Studio in California.

Casting
Upon series order announcement, Sykes and Epps were also cast to star. On March 4, 2020, Kim Fields joined the cast in a starring role. On December 2, 2020, Gabrielle Dennis, Page Kennedy, Diamond Lyons, Khali Daniya-Renee Spraggins, Jermelle Simon, and Journey Christine were cast in starring roles.

Reception
For the series, review aggregator Rotten Tomatoes reported an approval rating of 63% based on 8 critic reviews, with an average rating of 7/10.  Metacritic gave the series a weighted average score of 57 out of 100 based on 5 critic reviews, indicating "mixed or average reviews".

References

External links
 
 

2020s American black sitcoms
2021 American television series debuts
English-language Netflix original programming
Television series about families
Television shows set in Indianapolis
Television shows filmed in Los Angeles